Dorothy Alison (4 April 1925 – 17 January 1992) was an Australian stage, film and television actress

Biography 
Dorothy Alison was born in the New South Wales mining city of Broken Hill and educated at Sydney Girls High School. She moved to London in 1949 to further her career. Aside from her numerous, mostly supporting film roles, she appeared in several television programmes and miniseries, including a prominent role in A Town Like Alice, The Adventures of Robin Hood as the Duchess Constance and other TV shows.

She was nominated for two BAFTA awards: Most Promising Newcomer for Mandy (1952) and Best British Actress for Reach for the Sky (1956). For her performance in A Town Like Alice, she won the 1982 Logie Award (Australian television) for Best Supporting Actress in a Miniseries or Telemovie. She died at the age of 66 in London in 1992.

Partial filmography

Eureka Stockade (1949) - Mrs. Bentley
Sons of Matthew (1949) - Rose O'Riordan
Mandy (1952) - Miss Stockton
Turn the Key Softly (1953) - Joan
The Maggie (1954) - Miss Peters
The Purple Plain (1954) - Nurse (uncredited)
Child's Play (1954) - Margery Chappell
Companions in Crime (1954) - Sheila Marsden
The Feminine Touch (1956) - The Suicide
The Long Arm (1956) - Mary Halliday
Reach for the Sky (1956) - Nurse Brace
The Silken Affair (1956) - Mrs. Tweakham
Interpol (1957) - Helen
The Scamp (1957) - Barbara Leigh
The Man Upstairs (1958) - Mrs. Barnes
Life in Emergency Ward 10 (1959) - Sister Jane Fraser
The Nun's Story (1959) - Sister Aurelie (martyred nurse, Africa)
Two Living, One Dead (1961) - Esther Kester
Georgy Girl (1966) - Health Visitor
Pretty Polly (1967) - Mrs. Barlow
Journey into Darkness (1968) - Mrs. Latham (episode 'Paper Dolls')
See No Evil, also known as Blind Terror (1971) - Betty Rexton
Dr. Jekyll and Sister Hyde (1971) - Mrs. Spencer
The Amazing Mr Blunden (1972) - Mrs. Allen
Baxter! (1973) - Nurse Kennedy
The Return of the Soldier (1982) - Brigadier's Wife
The Winds of Jarrah (1983) - Mrs. Sullivan
The Schippan Mystery (1984) - Mrs. Schippan
Invitation to the Wedding (1985) - 1st Woman
A Fortunate Life (1986) - Mrs. Carr
Rikky and Pete (1988) - Mrs. Menzies
Evil Angels, also known as A Cry in the Dark (1988) - Avis Murchison
Two Brothers Running (1988) - Mrs Widmore
Australia (1989) - Doreen Swanson
Malpractice (1989) - Maureen Davis

References

External links

Dorothy Alison movies – All Movie Guide

1925 births
1992 deaths
20th-century Australian actresses
Australian stage actresses
Australian film actresses
Australian television actresses
Logie Award winners
People from Broken Hill, New South Wales
People educated at Sydney Girls High School